This is a list of publicly accessible parks in Aarhus. Some are managed by Aarhus Municipality, a few are private, and others are managed by institutions such as hospitals and universities.

 
Aarhus